Manoj Gupta (born  December 23, 1967) is an Indian publisher, editor, and the President and Co-founder of Raja Pocket Books and its subsidiary Raj comics. He established the most popular and longest running comic book company Raj Comics together with his brother Sanjay Gupta.
He co-created the characters Nagraj,Bankelal Doga, Bhokal, Yoddha etc.
He introduced digital-colouring in Raj Comics back in the 1990s, making it one of the first Indian brands to use the technique. Some consumers partially credit their wildly explosive success to this technological increment.

Publishing career

Early career 
Gupta began his career by editing and publishing pulp-fiction books along with his father Rajkumar Gupta. They had a highly-successful run and published critically acclaimed authors like Surender Mohan Pathak, Ved Prakash Sharma, Anil Mohan and Raja. At their peak, the books sold up to 1 million copies each. While his father always had a passion for crime-thrillers, Gupta and his brother Sanjay Gupta were always thrilled with the idea of creating original Indian Superheroes. One evening, while discussing the same, Rajkumar Gupta walked in on the conversation of the two brothers and thus, Raj Comics was born.

Raj Comics 
In the early days of its inception, Raj Comics published mythological, mystery and adventure comics. In 1985, Manoj Gupta came up with the idea of creating a superhero centered around snakes as he believed snakes held a religious and mythological significance in India. Later, the team started working on the concept and finally created the Nagraj that we know today.

Nagraj 

After publishing mythological, mystery and adventure comics, Gupta's quest for creating a superhero resulted in Nagraj in 1985 - and India got an action hero centered around snakes. This success led to the creation of more characters. Immediately after its launch, Nagraj became a widespread success and the issues started selling more than a million copies. The debut issue of Nagraj was written by Parshuram Sharma and illustrated by Pratap Mullick. After that Sanjay Ashtpure, Pratap Mullick, Chandu, Milind Misal and Vitthal Kamble alternately illustrated the character for 44 issues, ending in 1995 with Visarpi Ki Shadi. Since 1995, with Shakoora Ka Chakravyooh the illustration work of Nagraj has been taken over by artist and writer Anupam Sinha. "Nagraj was all the rage and we had to come up with a new issue every two weeks. Sanjay and I would isolate ourselves in a room every Sunday and when we came out, we always had a new script.", said Manoj Gupta in an interview in 2013. The brothers duo Manoj Gupta and Sanjay Gupta co-authored over 20 issues under the names of Raja and Sanjay Gupta in the golden age of Nagraj. These comics focused on defining Nagraj as a character and establishing his rogues gallery.

Hasya Samrat: Bankelal 
Bankelal first appeared in 1987 in the comic book 'Bankelal Ka Kamaal' ('Wonders of Bankelal') as a one shot. After going through the editing process, Manoj Gupta noticed the comic potential of the character and the entire 'Kar Bura ho Bhala' premise and started gathering elements and team to create Bankelal as a recurring character, notably, the first comedy character of Raj Comics to have a series of issues. Papinder Juneja and Jitendra Bedi worked on the first comic book as writer and artist respectively. Thereafter, Manoj Gupta took the project to Tarun Kumar Wahi, a regular at Raj Comics, to take the character forward.

Home of Indian Superheroes 

After the commercial success of Nagraj, Gupta launched Super Commando Dhruva, Doga, Bhokal, Tiranga, Bheriya, Parmanu and a number of other superheroes. Due to this, Raj Comics got the title of Home of Indian Superheroes from the public and media which it later incorporated in its brand name.

Comedy 
Other than action superheroes, Raj Comics also publishes the comedy genre. Gupta co-created and published fan-favorite characters like Bankelal and Gamraj (comics).

Comic Book based on Coronavirus 
In March 2020, Manoj Gupta authored a short comic book featuring Nagraj and a personification of the COVID-19 Virus called Coronaman. The comic book was released as a free for all special issue intended to spread awareness on precautionary measures against the disease. It also honored the healthcare workers and the authorities for their contribution in fighting the pandemic. The comic book went viral on all social media platforms and received widespread media coverage.

Comic Book based on Mental Health 
In September 2020, Manoj Gupta authored a short comic book featuring Super Commando Dhruva battling Depression. The comic book was released as a free for all special issue intended to spread awareness on World Suicide Prevention Day. "For writers Manoj Gupta and Ayush Gupta, the aim wasn't to spread awareness about mental illness but instead, to normalise it.", writes Dalreen Ramos in an article for Mid-Day.

List Of Published Original Comics 

After the split of Raj Comics into three different entities, Raj Comics By Manoj Gupta was launched.

References

External links
Raj Comics Official Website

Raj Comics
1967 births
Living people
Indian comics writers